Club Deportivo Academia de Fútbol Samuel Reyes is a Chilean Football club, their home town is Curicó, Chile.

The club was founded on May 11, 2002 and participated for 2 years in Tercera División b.

Seasons played
2 seasons in Tercera División B

See also
Chilean football league system

Football clubs in Chile
Association football clubs established in 2002
Sport in Maule Region
2002 establishments in Chile